Creation is an unfinished feature film, and a project of stop motion animator Willis O'Brien. It was about modern men encountering dinosaurs and other prehistoric animals on an island. The picture was scrapped by RKO studio head David O. Selznick on the grounds of expense, and Merian C. Cooper, the studio producer who recommended the film's cancellation, considered the storyline to be boring, due to lack of action. The completed footage ran 20 minutes in length, although approximately eleven minutes of footage is all that survives today. Cooper later used some of the miniatures and dinosaur armatures and O'Brien's stop-motion animation techniques for King Kong.

Plot
At 40 degrees south of the equator, off the coast of southern Chile, not far from Patagonia, the luxury yacht Titan rests at anchor. On board ship is wealthy American tycoon Thorton Armitage along with his young son Billy, his socialite daughter Elaine, her large soft aunt Louise, and Billy's personal tutor Steve, who teaches him about evolution. Meanwhile, below deck Elaine enters and flirts with Steve; thrilled at the thought that Elaine loves him, Steve grabs her in his arms. Elaine's fiancée, Ned Hallet, watches from a distance as the two kiss. When Steve looks to confess his love for Elaine, he is stunned as she explains that the kiss meant nothing. Embarrassed and enraged, Steve threatens to quit the crew, while above deck the passengers can see ominous storm clouds are brewing.

With freak suddenness, a tempest is upon them. Through heavy seas they see a submarine dispatched from the Chilean navy, in an effort to save the Armitage party. The Chilean captain enters and encourages the crew of the Titan to board the submarine. All of a sudden a massive waterspout forms, tears the Titan from its anchorage, and hurls it away. From the churning waters, a massive earthquake thrusts up a huge rocky promontory. The beautiful yacht is dashed upon the new island and is destroyed just as the submarine dives beneath the surging waves. The submarine is pulled downward by the rise of the rocky headland and spirals out of control. Buffeted by the surging currents and thrown off course, the stunned crew and passengers find themselves inside a deep underwater ravine. The submarine's crew look through the port to see green water filled with strange creatures. Their amazement is cut short as the sub runs aground on a volcanic shelf. The submarine then surfaces to find itself in a tropical lake surrounded by steep cliffs. They have traveled through deep underwater caverns and have surfaced in the cauldron of an extinct volcano.

The crew soon discover that dinosaurs exist on the island and promptly escape from a stampede of Brontosaurus. Later on shore, the Chilean crew are attacked by a prehistoric rhinoceros-like mammal known as an Arsinoitherium while trying to cross a log bridge. The Arsinoitherium gores many of the sailors to death, before knocking the fleeing sailors from the log bridge into the raging river below; weak with horror, Steve stumbles through the jungle back to the others and just avoids been killed by a bull woolly mammoth. The survivors, assuming that they will never see civilization again, build a shelter to live in on a high cliff over looking the lush valley. After Ned Hallet shoots a Brontosaurus, the sauropod retaliates by destroying one of the shelters with its long neck, and it is Elaine that saves everyone by striking a burning torch into the beast's mouth. Everyone is furious with Hallet for putting them in danger; Hallet leaves the camp in anger after being scolded and takes his frustration out on a baby Triceratops. Its mother rushes to the aid of the dying infant and gores Hallet to death.

Steve then takes command over the group and decides to repair the radio from the sub, but needs a replacement leyden jar for it to work. While the survivors are exploring ancient ruins, looking for a replacement leyden jar, a block gives way, causing Elaine to fall. Elaine is attacked by a Pteranodon which is driven off by Steve. Shortly afterwards, the crew are chased into a temple by an aggressive Stegosaurus. The crew is then trapped between the Stegosaurus and a Tyrannosaurus which lives in the temple. Rather than killing the crew, the two dinosaurs fight one another. In the end, the Tyrannosaurus kills the Stegosaurus and feeds it to its infant as the crew escapes.

After searching the temple, the crew discover a type of metal jar which they could use to get their radio working. The crew try to send out an S.O.S., but the volcano begins to erupt, causing mass hysteria among the dinosaurs and other prehistoric animals. A Pteranodon crashes into the tower used to conduct the signal, leaving the crew stranded to be killed by the erupting volcano. Facing death, Elaine and Steve finally confess their love for one another. As Billy faints from heat exhaustion, rescue planes arrive and land on the boiling lake and save the crew from certain doom.

Aboard the rescue ship, Thorton Armitage boasts of his group's adventures. Everyone is sceptical about his claims, when suddenly a Pteranodon, exhausted from its long flight, falls aboard the ship's deck, proving his story to be true. The film ends with Steve and Elaine sharing a laugh as they look forward to their new life together.

Legacy
Despite his dislike for the film's story, the special effects in the completed footage impressed Cooper and inspired him to hire O'Brien to create the effects in Cooper's film King Kong (1933). Some of the dinosaur scenes planned for Creation were even rewritten and inserted into the King Kong script and most of the dinosaur models O'Brien used in Kong had originally been made for Creation. The shipwreck sequence in Kongs companion production, The Most Dangerous Game, was reportedly salvaged from this film.

In the two-disc 2005 DVD release of King Kong, the surviving footage from Creation is shown, as well as a dramatization of how the entire film might have been like if completed, using a combination of the existing footage, along with production sketches, test stills and a voiceover narrator.

In the remaining footage, two infant Triceratops play tug of war with a vine before their mother separates the two. The loser of the conflict wanders off into the jungle where it views a chimpanzee, a jaguar, and eventually an armed sailor identified by the script as Ned Hallet. Hallet stumbles upon the infant Triceratops and shoots it through the eye. The dying infant screams out to its mother who charges to the rescue, chasing Hallet through the jungle. The final scene in which Ned Hallet is gored to death by the vengeful mother is lost. Merian C. Cooper intended to use the footage in King Kong, but felt that it did not fit in with the rest. An altered scene involving three adult Triceratops, two of which are killed by Kong, while the third one shows up at one side of the log bridge over the chasm into which Kong (on the other side) kills some of the men on the bridge by rolling it back and forth, causing them to fall to their deaths below, does appear in the 1932 Kong screenplay and the film's novelization.

Parts of the remaining footage can also be seen in the computer game Dinosaur Museum by Perspective Visuals and the educational video More Dinosaurs.

Some of the other creatures planned for the film were an Agathaumas, a Styracosaurus and an Ankylosaurus, according to concept art.

Influence on Kong
 The scene in King Kong in which Kong shakes sailors off of a log bridge was inspired by the scene in Creation in which the Arsinoitherium knocks sailors from a log.
 Ann Darrow's abduction by the Pteranodon was heavily inspired by a scene in Creation in which a Pteranodon attempted to abduct Elaine, Steve's love interest.
 Kong's battle with the Tyrannosaurus was taken from a scene in Creation where the Tyrannosaurus battles a Stegosaurus in an ancient golden temple.
 All of the dinosaur models featured in King Kong were originally designed for Creation.

Characters in Creation
 Steve – Billy Armitage's tutor (who would have been played by Joel McCrea) the story's main protagonist
 Thorton Armitage – an American tycoon
 Elaine Armitage – Thorton Armitage's socialite daughter
 Billy Armitage – Thorton Armitage's youngest child
 Ned Hallet – Elaine's fiancée (played by Ralf Harolde, the only confirmed cast member)
 Louise – Billy and Elaine's friendly and overweight aunt
 Benny – a Jewish chef
 Chico – Elaine's pet monkey

Bestiary

Dinosaurs
 Brontosaurus
 Triceratops (with young)
 Stegosaurus
 Tyrannosaurus (with young)
 Agathaumas (in concept art)
 Styracosaurus (in concept art)
 Ankylosaurus (in concept art)
 Trachodon (in concept art)

Other Prehistoric animals
 Arsinoitherium
 Woolly mammoth
 Glyptodon (in concept art)
 Megatherium (armature possibly used for the Son of Kong’s cave bear)
 Elasmosaurus
 Pteranodon
 Dimorphodon

Modern animals
 Chimpanzee
 Jaguar

See also
 List of stop-motion films

References

Sources
 Orville Goldner and George E. Turner, The Making of King Kong (New York: Ballantine Books, 1975), contains information about, and stills from, this unfinished film
 RKO Production 601: The Making of Kong, The Eighth Wonder of the World (Willis O'Brien and Creation)

External links
 
 
 On the origins of the original 1933 King Kong

American fantasy films
1930s unfinished films
1930s monster movies
American black-and-white films
King Kong (franchise)
Lost American films
1930s American animated films
1930s stop-motion animated films
Films set in Chile
Films set in prehistory
Films set on islands
Films set in the Pacific Ocean
Unfinished animated films
Films about dinosaurs
1930s fantasy films
1932 films
1932 animated films
1932 horror films
1930s English-language films